Mattress Music is the fifth studio album by American R&B singer Marques Houston. It was scheduled for release by MusicWorks Entertainment and EMI on September 14, 2010. The album's lead single is "Kickin' & Screamin'," which peaked at number 71 on the Billboard Hot R&B/Hip-Hop Songs chart. The second single is "Pullin' on Her Hair," featuring rapper Rick Ross.

Track listing

Charts

References 

Marques Houston albums
2010 albums